Alpha Wave Movement (established 1992 in Miami, Florida) is the electronic music project of Gregory T. Kyryluk. Alpha Wave Movement's musical style can be considered ambient, new-age, some space rock, the classic 1970s period German style electronic music otherwise known as Berlin school as well as the ambient aesthetics of Brian Eno, and Steve Roach. Releases such A Distant Signal and Terra have more ambient space elements than other Alpha Wave Movement releases. Beyond Silence has more space rock elements and has a more rhythmic feel in their overall music compositions. In 2007 Alpha Wave Movement released The Mystic & The Machine, a musical exploration of 1970's era romantic progressive rock performed on synthesizers with the addition of UK musician Steve Hillman on electric guitar. The influences of Genesis, Ozric Tentacles (1980s era), and Camel are quite obvious and intended and shows yet another side of Alpha Wave Movement's composition. Alpha Wave Movement's music is semi electronic-based, utilizing digital synthesizers and MIDI to create its sonic explorations. 
Aside from the music influences nature and natural landscapes are a continuous source of inspiration for compositions. Alpha Wave Movement has performed at the Ambient Ping Canada and at the Gathering Room USA. Alpha Wave Movement has released music on the Dutch label Groove Unlimited, Silent Records (USA), Waveform Records (USA), Spiralight (USA), Anodize (USA) and on the private label Harmonic Resonance Recordings. Alpha Wave Movement's other projects include Thought Guild (vintage synthesizer improvisation project with synthesist Christopher Cameron), Open Canvas, Subtle Shift, Biome and a solo release as Gregory Kyryluk.
The latest release from Alpha Wave Movement is entitled "Soniq Variants"(2011). The release is based conceptually on the use of Ensoniq synthesizers solely for the compositions. Ensoniq was an American manufacturer that spearheaded early affordable synthesizer workstation's the first of which was the ESQ-1 in 1986. Music on this release was composed primarily on the ESQ-1, VFX-SD, SQ-R and a DP4 all of which were made by Ensoniq. Additional use of a Novation synthesizer was also incorporated to add some timbral texture.
The year 2012 arrived with a new electronic music project by Gregory Kyryluk under the alias of Subtle Shift (early releases where under the alias of Within Reason). This new project dives head into the ambient dub waterways. Featuring a more sublime percussive foundation, environmental soundscapes. Drawn on the influences of the Detroit and European creative pioneering spirits such as Rod Modell and Yagya, GAS as well as incorporating 1970s electro aesthetics. To date there are four full-length releases by Subtle Shift on the Anodize and Harmonic Resonance Recording labels.
In 2014 the electronica world fusion project Open Canvas (essentially Gregory Kyryluk) had a track from the Waveform Records release "Indumani" featured in the internationally popular gothic horror show True Blood. The Open Canvas track "Ojopati" was featured in the final season episode 3.

Discography

Full-length as Alpha Wave Movement
 2021: Infinite Realms
 2019: Polyphasic Music
 2018: Somnus
 2018: Tranquility Space Volume 1
 2017: Echoes In The Vacuum
 2017: Cerulean Skies
 2016: Kinetic
 2015/16: Harmonic Currents
 2015: Earthen
 2015: System A
 2014: Horizons
 2014: Archaic Frontiers 
 2014: Celestial Chronicles
 2013: Architexture of Silence
 2013: Yasumu
 2012: Exiled Particles - Archives Volume I
 2012: Eolian Reflections
 2011: Myriad Stars
 2011: Soniq Variants
 2009: Cosmic Mandala
 2008: Terra
 2007: The Mystic & The Machine
 2007: The Regions Between
 2005: Ephemeral Highways
 2005: Beyond Silence
 2003: Cosmology 
 2002: A Distant Signal
 2000: Bislama
 2000: Drifted Into Deeper Lands
1998: Concept of Motion 
1997: The Edge of Infinity 
1995: Transcendence

Full-length as Biome
 2021: Essence
 2018: The Shores of Temenos

Full-length as Subtle Shift (Formerly known as Within Reason)
 2022: Somber Frequencies
 2014: Farshadow 
 2013: Transient Broadcasts 
 2013: Substrate: Collected Elements 
 2012: Subtle Shift

Full-Length as Thought Guild
 2018: Archiphonic 
 2013: Electrik Curios 
 2012: Third Voyage 
 2005: Continuum
 2002: Context

Full-length as Open Canvas
 2014: Relics of the Sun (Dune Tunes 1997-1999)
 2009: Travel by Sound
 2000: Indumani
 1998: Nomadic Impressions

Full-length as Gregory Kyryluk
 2005: Ephemeral Highways

Compilations
 Die Welt Ist Klang: A Tribute to Pete Namlook 
 Ambienism
 From Here to Tranquility #4
 The Other World
 The Truth Is Twisted
 Lektronic Soundscapes II
 Sequences Magazine Issue #26
 Sequences Magazine Anniversary Issue
 EMPortal: Joint Efforts the Album

Video games
 Grand Theft Auto IV

Video
 Headcandy: Sidney's Psychedelic Adventure

Television
 True Blood  final season, episode 3 "Music from Open Canvas 'Indumani

External links
 Biome on Bandcamp
 Alpha Wave Movement on Bandcamp
 Open Canvas on Discogs
 Thought Guild on Discogs
 Harmonic Resonance Bandcamp

American electronic musicians
American electronic music groups
Ambient musicians